Butternut squash (Cucurbita moschata), known in Australia and New Zealand as butternut pumpkin or gramma, is a type of winter squash that grows on a vine. It has a sweet, nutty taste similar to that of a pumpkin. It has tan-yellow skin and orange fleshy pulp with a compartment of seeds in the blossom end. When ripe, it turns increasingly deep orange, and becomes sweeter and richer. It is a good source of fiber, vitamin C, magnesium, and potassium; and it is a source of vitamin A.

Although botanically a fruit (specifically, a berry), butternut squash is used culinarily as a vegetable that can be roasted, sautéed, toasted, puréed for soups such as squash soup, or mashed to be used in casseroles, breads, muffins, and pies. It is part of the same squash family as ponca, waltham, pumpkin, and calabaza.

History 
The word squash comes from the Narragansett word askutasquash, meaning "eaten raw or uncooked", and butternut from the squash's nutty flavor.  Although American native peoples may have eaten some forms of squash without cooking, today most squash is eaten cooked. Native Americans believed that squash was so nutritious that they would bury their dead with it to sustain them on their final journey.

Before the arrival of Europeans, C. moschata had been carried over all parts of North America where it could be grown, but butternut squash is a modern variety of winter squash. It was developed by Charles Legget of Stow, Massachusetts, in 1944 who crossed pumpkin and gooseneck squash varieties.

Attributes
Butternut squash will store for two to three months. Some varieties will keep up to six months. For the best flavor, butternut squash should be left to cure for 2 months after harvest.

Nutrition
 Raw butternut squash is 86% water, 12% carbohydrates, 1% protein, and contains negligible fat (table). A 100-gram reference amount supplies  of food energy, is a rich source (20% or more of the Daily Value, DV) of vitamin A (67% DV) and vitamin C (25% DV), and contains moderate amounts of vitamin B6, vitamin E, magnesium, and manganese, each having content of 10–12% DV.

Culinary uses
One of the most common ways to prepare butternut squash is roasting. Once roasted, it can be eaten in a variety of ways. The fruit is prepared by removing the skin, stalk, and seeds, which are not usually eaten or cooked. However, the seeds are edible, either raw or roasted, and the skin is also edible and softens when roasted. The seeds can even be roasted and pressed into an oil to create butternut squash seed oil. This oil can be used for roasting, cooking, on popcorn, or as a salad dressing.

In Australia, it is regarded as a pumpkin, and is used interchangeably with other types of pumpkin.

In South Africa, butternut squash is commonly used and often prepared as a soup or grilled whole. Grilled butternut is typically seasoned with nutmeg and cinnamon or stuffed (e.g., spinach and feta) before being wrapped in foil and grilled.  Grilled butternut is often served as a side dish to braais (barbecues) and the soup as a starter dish.

Butternuts were introduced commercially in New Zealand in the 1950s by brothers Arthur and David Harrison, nursery workers, and Otaki market gardeners.

See also
 Calabaza
 Kabocha
Acorn squash
Spaghetti squash

References

Squashes and pumpkins
Thanksgiving food